The Salem Hills are a range of hills spanning from southern Salem, Oregon, United States, south to Jefferson, west to the Willamette River and east to Turner and Marion.

They have also been called the Ankeny Hills, Chemeketa Hills, Illahee Hills, Red Clay Hills, Red Hills, and the South Salem Hills.

See also
Eola Hills
Waldo Hills

References

Hills of Oregon
Landforms of Marion County, Oregon
Turner, Oregon